Ilkka Herola (born 22 June 1995) is a Finnish nordic combined skier. He competed at the FIS Nordic World Ski Championships 2013 in Val di Fiemme, and at the 2014 Winter Olympics in Sochi.

Together with Eero Hirvonen, he won the 2 x 7.5 km team sprint on 9 February 2019, in front of their home crowd in Lahti.

Results
All results are sourced from FIS.

Record

Olympic Games

World Championships

World Cup

Season standings

Individual Podiums

Team Podiums

References

External links

1995 births
Living people
Nordic combined skiers at the 2014 Winter Olympics
Nordic combined skiers at the 2018 Winter Olympics
Nordic combined skiers at the 2022 Winter Olympics
Finnish male Nordic combined skiers
Olympic Nordic combined skiers of Finland
Nordic combined skiers at the 2012 Winter Youth Olympics
People from Siilinjärvi
FIS Nordic World Ski Championships medalists in Nordic combined
Sportspeople from North Savo
21st-century Finnish people